Humo de Marihuana is an Argentine black-and-white film directed by Lucas Demare. The film was released on May 17, 1968.

Plot 
A doctor investigates the death of his wife and realizes that drugs were beginning to affect the country.

Cast 
 Carlos Estrada …Carlos Ocampo
 Marcela López Rey …Fabiana
 Thelma Biral …Marcela
 Sergio Renán …Julián Macedo
 Héctor Pellegrini …Martínez
 Enrique Fava …Di Pietro
 Horacio Nicolai
 Juan Carlos Galván …Marco
 Zelmar Gueñol …Police
 Elida Marletta …Strip teaser
 Fabiana Gavel …Fabiana's sister
 David Llewellyn …Chico
 Guillermo Helbling …Jorge

External links 
 

1968 films
1960s Spanish-language films
Argentine black-and-white films
Argentine films about cannabis
1968 drama films
1968 in cannabis
Argentine drama films
Films directed by Lucas Demare
1960s Argentine films